Lorenzo Cesa (born 16 August 1951) is an Italian politician and the current Secretary of the Union of the Centre.

Biography 

Cesa graduated in Political Science from the LUISS University in Rome. He was manager of important companies and banks, including ANAS.

He was elected Municipal councillor of Rome with the Christian Democracy. Subsequently he joined the Christian Democratic Centre and the Union of Christian and Centre Democrats.

In the 2004 European Parliament election Cesa was elected MEP with 103,000 preference votes.

On 27 October 2005 he was elected Secretary of the UDC, succeeding Marco Follini. 

In the 2006 general election he was elected to the Chamber of Deputies, so he resigned as MEP. He was also re-elected MP in the 2008 and 2013 elections.

In the 2014 European Parliament election he was again elected MEP, among the ranks of the New Centre-Right – UDC. In the general election of 2018 he was a candidate for the Chamber of Deputies, in the uninominal college of Nola (with the support of the centre-right coalition) and in the relative proportional list (Us with Italy – UDC), but he was not elected, so kept the office as an MEP.

In the 2019 European election Cesa was candidate on the Forza Italia list, but he was not re-elected.

Political proposals 

Lorenzo Cesa proposed a Parliamentary Immunity to manage sex temptations allowing the Italian Parliament members wives to get money from the Italian State to go in the city where their husbands work.

Legal problems 

Lorenzo Cesa was condemned on 21 June 2001 to 3 years of imprisonment for bribery with the Anas company.

On November 2010 Italian Authorities sequestered 1 million euro private goods from Lorenzo Cesa.

References

External links
 

1951 births
Living people
People from the Metropolitan City of Rome Capital
Christian Democracy (Italy) politicians
Christian Democratic Centre politicians
Union of the Centre (2002) politicians
Deputies of Legislature XV of Italy
Deputies of Legislature XVI of Italy
Deputies of Legislature XVII of Italy
Politicians of Lazio
Union of the Centre (2002) MEPs
MEPs for Italy 2004–2009
MEPs for Italy 2014–2019
Libera Università Internazionale degli Studi Sociali Guido Carli alumni